In enzymology, a long-chain-fatty-acyl-CoA reductase is an enzyme that catalyzes the chemical reaction

a long-chain aldehyde + CoA + NADP+  a long-chain acyl-CoA + NADPH + H+

The 3 substrates of this enzyme are long-chain aldehyde, CoA, and NADP+, whereas its 3 products are long-chain acyl-CoA, NADPH, and H+.

This enzyme belongs to the family of oxidoreductases, specifically those acting on the aldehyde or oxo group of donor with NAD+ or NADP+ as acceptor.  The systematic name of this enzyme class is long-chain-aldehyde:NADP+ oxidoreductase (acyl-CoA-forming). Other names in common use include acyl-CoA reductase, and acyl coenzyme A reductase.

References

 
 

EC 1.2.1
NADPH-dependent enzymes
Enzymes of unknown structure